NERC may refer to:
 Natural Environment Research Council
 Nashville & Eastern Railroad Corporation
 North American Electric Reliability Corporation
 Nigerian Electricity Regulatory Commission